Kitasatospora aburaviensis is a bacterium species from the genus Kitasatospora which was isolated from soil from Aburabi from the Shiga Prefecture in Japan. Kitasatospora aburaviensis produces the antibiotics aburamycin and ablastmycin and the enzyme inhibitor ebelactone.

References

Further reading

External links
Type strain of Streptomyces aburaviensis at BacDive -  the Bacterial Diversity Metadatabase

Streptomycineae
Bacteria described in 1957